The 2022–23 season is the 120th in the history of SpVgg Greuther Fürth and their first season back in the second division. The club will participate in the 2. Bundesliga and DFB-Pokal.

Players

Transfers

In

Out

Pre-season and friendlies

Competitions

Overall record

2. Bundesliga

League table

Results summary

Results by round

Matches 
The league fixtures were announced on 17 June 2022.

DFB-Pokal

References

SpVgg Greuther Fürth seasons
Greuther Fürth